Darroch may refer to:

 Darroch (surname) (with a list of people surnamed Darroch)
 Clan Darroch, a Scottish clan
 Darroch Hall in HM Prison Greenock, Scotland, accommodates female offenders
 Darroch Ball, New Zealand politician